Yamagiwa is a Japanese surname that may refer to
Daishiro Yamagiwa (born 1968), Japanese politician
Joseph K. Yamagiwa (1906–1968), American educator
Yamagiwa Katsusaburō (1863–1930), Japanese pathologist and cancer researcher
Masamichi Yamagiwa (1901–1975), Japanese businessman

Japanese-language surnames